Unchain My Heart may refer to:

 "Unchain My Heart" (song), a 1961 song by Bobby Sharp
 Unchain My Heart (album), a 1987 album by Joe Cocker